Lan Tominc (born 15 May 2002) is a Slovenian canoeist. He competed at the 2018 Summer Youth Olympics in the canoeing competition, winning the gold medal in the boys' K1 slalom event.

References

External links 

2002 births
Living people
Place of birth missing (living people)
Slovenian male canoeists
Canoeists at the 2018 Summer Youth Olympics
Youth Olympic gold medalists for Slovenia